Robert of Alençon (1344–1377) was the son of Charles II of Alençon and Maria de La Cerda y Lara. He succeeded his father in 1346 as Count of Perche.

On 5 April 1374 he married Jeanne (d. aft. 20 January 1407), the daughter of John I, Viscount of Rohan. They had one son, Charles (1375–1377), who did not survive his father.

References

Sources

External links
 Styles of the Counts of Alencon and Perche
 

1344 births
1377 deaths
House of Valois-Alençon
Counts of Perche

14th-century peers of France
14th-century French people